Leptometa is a genus of moths in the family Lasiocampidae. The genus was erected by Per Olof Christopher Aurivillius in 1927.

Species
Some species of this genus are:
Leptometa hintzi Hering, 1928
Leptometa matuta (Schaus & Clements, 1893)
Leptometa sapelensis Aurivillius, 1927

References

Lasiocampidae